Brook Street Chapel, is in the town of Knutsford, Cheshire, England.  It is recorded in the National Heritage List for England as a designated Grade I listed building.  The chapel was built in soon after the passing of the Act of Toleration 1689.  It is built in red brick with a stone-flagged roof in two storeys with two external staircases.  Inside is a gallery on three sides and a pulpit on a long wall.  The pulpit dates from the late 17th or early 18th century and the pews from 1859.

It is the burial place of the novelist Mrs Gaskell who died in 1865, her husband William Gaskell who died in 1884, and their two unmarried daughters who died in 1908 and 1913.

It is still in use as a Unitarian chapel.

See also

Grade I listed churches in Cheshire
Grade I listed buildings in Cheshire East
Listed buildings in Knutsford

References

External links 
 
 The Gaskell Society

Unitarian chapels in England
Knutsford, Brook Street Chapel
17th-century Protestant churches
Knutsford
17th-century churches in the United Kingdom